Mudeford, Stanpit and West Highcliffe is a ward in Christchurch, Dorset. Since 2019, the ward has elected 2 councillors to Bournemouth, Christchurch and Poole Council.

Geography 
The ward covers the areas of Mudeford, Stanpit, Friars Cliff and the western parts of Highcliffe-on-Sea.

Election results

2019

References 

Politics of Christchurch, Dorset
Wards of Bournemouth, Christchurch and Poole